Floydforce was the name given to the British Army intervention unit in Yugoslavia in October 1944, during the Second World War. Its main objective was to aid Yugoslav Partisans, led by Marshal Tito, in preventing German withdrawal from Greece and Albania via Montenegro, and "to give the greatest possible artillery support to the Yugoslav National Army of Liberation".  It was a continuation of the British Government policy of support and supply that started with the Maclean Mission and culminated in Tito's meeting with Winston Churchill in Naples in August 1943.

Background 
As Allied troops from the East and West were moving towards Berlin, they realised that large German military formations such as Army Group E will eventually abandon Greece, Albania and Yugoslavia and withdraw to defence lines further north. This would reinvigorate and resupply their troops in the region and likely extend the war.

In September 1944, Operation Ratweek was launched, aiming to frustrate German movements through Serbia, Croatia and Slovenia.  Now, the movement via the secondary route in Montenegro had to be disrupted as well. Very mountainous terrain did not land itself well to aerial bombardment so heavy artillery and land troops had to be deployed. The Partisans, used to hand-to-hand, small-arms warfare had neither the long-range guns nor the experience.

Arrival 
The force consisted of batteries from 111th (Bolton) Field Regiment, Royal Artillery, No. 43 (Royal Marine) Commando and 579th Army Field Company, Royal Engineers. Commanded by Brigadier J P O'Brien-Twohig, it sailed in four Landing craft, tank (LCT) and three Landing Craft, Infantry (LCI) from Bari to Dubrovnik on 27 October 1944 and arrived the following day.

Their first target was to block the German breakout at Risan, along the coastal route of the Bay of Kotor. Dedicated group, named Finney Force was assembled for the task. It consisted of 211 Field Battery with eight 25-pounder guns and 'C' Troop of No. 43 Commando. The Battery Commander Major Pat Turner was in overall command, while 'C' Troop was led by Captain Robert Loundoun. The two commanders travelled via Trebinje, Bileća i Vilusi, to reach Podhan - a strategic location from which they could see and shell the German troops in the town of Risan, Ledenice barracks and in five old Imperial Austrian forts nearby. They arrived on 29 October, preparing for the first battle the following morning.

Risan Operation 

The advanced guard of the German Army Group E, found from the XXI Mountain Corps, had already entered Montenegro and used a narrow, meandering road that follows the Bay of Kotor eventually reaching Risan. Both the Partisans and the British gunners on the high rock shelf, 1,600 feet above the Bay, could see German movements and once the weather had cleared, heavy bombardment started. After seeing the volume and accuracy of the shelling the Germans realised that they were not dealing with the traditional Partisan fighters, but much better trained and equipped army units. Some tried to surrender to the British troops, hoping for a better treatment, but it was already agreed that all POWs were to be handed over to the Partisans.

By 4 November, the bombardment had been so heavy that an attempt was made to ask Germans to surrender. They were barricaded in a local sawmill and hospital. The negotiations failed, and the hostilities continued. On 7 November, the first German fort was breached, and two days later the second. Germans were trying to send reinforcements from Kotor to Risan via the narrow and winding road. They also assembled a force at Mostar, 75 miles north-west, in order to free them up, but these were successfully contained by the local Partisans.

By this time the decision has been made to blow up the road and at least damage it enough to prevent heavy vehicles crossing. Capt Loundoun led the expedition which laid the explosive in a culvert about two miles from Risan. The operation was successful.

By 17 November, the last three forts fell and Ledenice barracks surrendered with 43 dead, over 70 wounded and 197 unhurt German soldiers. Shortly after, the Germans withdrew from Risan as well, and the town was taken over by the Partisans. One of the three routes, the southernmost one, was now closed off and the Finney Force achieved its objective and withdrew to Bileća to wait further instructions.

Podgorica Operation and the withdrawal 

The second, central, route for withdrawal was via Danilovgrad and Nikšić. British contingent consisting of Raiding Support Regiment, a troop of 43 Commando and No. 579 Field Company of the Royal Engineers gathered the troops and heavy artillery at Nikšić and prepared to demolish the 150 yards-long stone bridge nearby, should a need arise. However, the Partisans were able to enter Danilovgrad, thus making this route impassable for the German troops, leaving them with only one, most difficult, northernmost route via Kolašin.

The bulk of German troops was already on Montenegrin territory, in the town of Podgorica, desperate for a passage north. On 5 December, Major W.H. Cheesman took a convoy of troops, heavy guns and a detachment of sappers with a flat-packed Bailey bridge to Risan. They knew the terrain well, as they had been monitoring and shelling it for weeks already. Once in Risan, they followed the road onto Kotor installing and crossing the Bailey bridge on the way. After a couple of days on the coast, the mission reached Cetinje on 9 December. Just as they were preparing to continue onto Podgorica, an order was received to return all the way back to Vilusi, where their journey had started. They duly withdrew, taking back the Bailey bridge as ordered.

Meanwhile, the troops remaining in Nikšić prepared to move onto Danilovgrad, via a heavily damaged road. They passed the town on 13 December and started amassing the firepower towards Podgorica and the road to Bioče, German's last remaining route. Heavy shelling had started and lasted until 19 December together with the aerial bombardment by the Balkan Air Force. Podgorica was freed, and the chase of the Germans onto Bioče and Kolašin continued. By 22 December, there was a diminishing number of targets that could be visually identified, and the risk of shooting at Partisans in error increased. This was the last day of British active intervention and the troops and the equipment were brought back to Italy to assist in the campaign the following month.

Controversies 
Floydforce was an unusual and somewhat strained operation. It spanned significant ideological, geopolitical and military contradictions.

At the same time, the Partisans feared a bigger British landing and intervention. British Government still hosted and supported the Royal Yugoslav Government-in-Exile as well as King Peter II of Yugoslavia. Finally, the future of Istria, Rijeka and Trieste was yet to be decided. Winston Churchill thought of this as the key stumbling block and wrote to Tito on 3 December:

Tito was visiting Stalin in Moscow, when the news of British units arrival broke out. Tito reassured Stalin that it must have been just a few batteries of artillery that he had asked for. Stalin then questioned what would he do if the British really tried to land against his will in Yugoslavia. "We should offer determined resistance." - came Tito's reply.

References

Sources

External links 
Robert Loundoun's obituary in the Independent

Eastern European theatre of World War II
Yugoslavia in World War II
United Kingdom–Yugoslavia relations